The 2006 Taça de Portugal Final was the final match of the 2005–06 Taça de Portugal, the 66th season of the Taça de Portugal, the premier Portuguese football cup competition organized by the Portuguese Football Federation (FPF). The match was played on 14 May 2006 at the Estádio Nacional in Oeiras, and opposed two Primeira Liga sides: Porto and Vitória de Setúbal. Porto defeated Vitória 1–0 thanks to a second-half strike from Brazilian striker Adriano, which would claim Porto a 13th Taça de Portugal.

In Portugal, the final was televised live on RTP and Sport TV. As Porto claimed both league and cup double in the same season, cup runners-up Vitória de Setúbal faced their cup final opponents in the 2006 Supertaça Cândido de Oliveira at the Estádio Dr. Magalhães Pessoa in Leiria.

Match

Details

References

2006
2005–06 in Portuguese football
FC Porto matches
Vitória F.C. matches